The Greater St. Louis metropolitan area has many cultural institutions and museums including:

The Gateway Arch and the Museum of Westward Expansion. The Museum of Westward Expansion is an underground museum beneath the Gateway Arch focusing on St. Louis' role in the expansion and settling of the United States west of the Mississippi River before and after the Louisiana Purchase.
The Saint Louis Art Museum, Missouri History Museum, Jewel Box, Saint Louis Zoo, McDonnell Planetarium, and the Muny are all located in Forest Park, the city's premiere park.
The City Museum has a collection of re-purposed architectural and industrial objects constituting a multistory play-land. It also features an aquarium and a museum of historical architecture.
Grand Center is a historic arts and culture district that is home to the Fox Theatre, the Contemporary Art Museum St. Louis, Pulitzer Arts Foundation, and The Sheldon.
Cahokia Mounds is a national historic site, state historic site, and UNESCO World Heritage Site, Cahokia Mounds hosts an interpretive center with many models and artifacts related to ancient Mississippian culture.
Mastodon State Historic Site is home to the Kimmswick Bonebed mastodon fossil collection.  There is a small museum dedicated to mastodons on site.

Museums

Art
 Center of Creative Arts
 Contemporary Art Museum St. Louis
 Foundry Art Centre
 Gallery 210 at University of Missouri–St. Louis
 International Photography Hall of Fame and Museum
 Laumeier Sculpture Park
 Lemp Neighborhood Arts Center
 May Gallery of Webster University
 Mildred Lane Kemper Art Museum
 Museum of Contemporary Religious Art
 National Blues Museum
 American Kennel Club's Museum of the Dog
 Pulitzer Arts Foundation
 Saint Louis Art Museum
 St. Louis Mercantile Library Art Museum
 Saint Louis University Museum of Art
 The Sheldon Art Galleries
 William and Florence Schmidt Art Center

Architecture
 Gateway Arch
 Frank Lloyd Wright Kraus House

Botanic Conservatory
 Jewel Box
 Missouri Botanical Garden

Children's
 City Museum
 The Magic House, St. Louis Children's Museum

History
 Alton Museum of History and Art
 Anheuser-Busch Brewery
 Basilica of St. Louis, King of France
 Campbell House Museum
 Carondelet Historic Center
 Cathedral Basilica of Saint Louis
 Chatillon-DeMenil House
 Cupples House
 Daniel Boone Home
 Faust Village
 Eugene Field House
 First Missouri State Capitol State Historic Site
 Fenton Historical Museum
 The Griot Museum of Black History
 Hawken House Museum
 Historic Hanley House
 Historic House Museums of St. Louis
 Holocaust Museum & Learning Center
 Jefferson Barracks Museums
 Jefferson Barracks Telephone Museum
 Scott Joplin House State Historic Site
 Kemp Auto Museum
 Lemp Mansion
 Lewis and Clark State Historic Site
 Missouri Civil War Museum
 Missouri History Museum
 Museum of Westward Expansion
 Old Cahokia Courthouse
 Old Courthouse
 Soldiers' Memorial
 St. Charles County Heritage Museum
 Benjamin Stephenson House
 Taille de Noyer
 Thomas Sappington Museum
 Ulysses S. Grant National Historic Site
 Union Station

Science, archeology, and natural history
 Cahokia Mounds
 Crow Observatory
 Mastodon State Historic Site
 McDonnell Planetarium
 Saint Louis Science Center

Sports
 St. Louis Cardinals Hall of Fame Museum
 St. Louis Soccer Hall of Fame
 World Chess Hall of Fame

Transportation
 Greater Saint Louis Air & Space Museum
 Historic Aircraft Restoration Museum
 National Museum of Transportation

Zoological
 Butterfly House
 World Aquarium
 Saint Louis Zoo

Special Interest
 First Due Museum
 Miniature Museum of Greater St. Louis

Festivals and fairs
 Cinco de Mayo St. Louis
 Fair Saint Louis
 Great Forest Park Balloon Race
 Greater St. Louis Renaissance Faire
 Kimmswick Apple Butter Festival
 Kimmswick Strawberry Festival
 Missouri Chamber Music Festival
 Opera Theatre of Saint Louis
 Shakespeare Festival of St. Louis
 St. Louis Arts Fair
 St. Louis Brewers Festival
 St. Louis Chinese Culture Day
 St. Louis Earth Day Festival
 St. Louis Festival of Nations
 St. Louis International Film Festival
 St. Louis Jazz & Heritage Festival
 St. Louis Jugglefest
 St. Louis PrideFest
 St. Louis Storytelling Festival
 St. Louis Tap Festival
 St. Louis Wine Festival

Music, theater and performing arts

Dance

Opera (companies)
 Opera Theatre of Saint Louis
 Union Avenue Opera

Opera (houses)
 Peabody Opera House

Choruses
 Saint Louis Chamber Chorus
 St. Louis Children's Choir
 Saint Louis Symphony Chorus

Symphonies
 St. Louis Symphony
 Saint Louis Symphony Youth Orchestra
 St. Louis Philharmonic

Concert Halls
 Powell Hall
 The Sheldon Concert Hall

Theater (companies)
 The Black Repertory Theater
 Conservatory of Theatre Arts
 New Line Theatre
 The Repertory Theatre of St. Louis

Theater (houses)
 Edison Theater at Washington University
 The Grandel Theatre
 Fox Theatre
 Loretto-Hilton Center for the Performing Arts at Webster University
 The Muny
 Orthwein Theater at Mary Institute and St. Louis Country Day School
 The Touhill Performing Arts Center at the University of Missouri - St. Louis

See also
 Culture of St. Louis

References

Museums in Greater St. Louis